Salman Khan is an Indian actor and producer, known for his work in Hindi films. He made his film debut with a brief role in Biwi Ho To Aisi (1988), before having his breakthrough with Sooraj Barjatya's blockbuster romance Maine Pyar Kiya (1989) that won him the Filmfare Award for Best Male Debut. In the early 1990s, he earned success with the action films Baaghi: A Rebel for Love (1990) and Patthar Ke Phool (1991) and the romance Saajan (1991). His other releases during this period failed commercially, resulting in a brief setback in his career.

The success of the family drama Hum Aapke Hain Koun..! (1994) and the melodramatic action Karan Arjun (1995) revitalised Khan's career and established him in Bollywood. Also in 1994, he co-starred with Aamir Khan in the comedy Andaz Apna Apna, which was poorly received at that time, but later became a cult film in India. Among his three film releases of 1996 were Sanjay Leela Bhansali's critically acclaimed musical drama Khamoshi and the Raj Kanwar-directed drama Jeet. The following year, he played dual roles in David Dhawan's comedy Judwaa. In 1998, Khan featured in Sohail Khan's Pyaar Kiya To Darna Kya, and appeared briefly in the romantic drama Kuch Kuch Hota Hai, both of which ranked among the top-earning Bollywood productions of 1998. For the latter, he was awarded the Filmfare Award for Best Supporting Actor.

In 1999, Khan starred in three commercially successful productions: the comedy Biwi No.1, the romantic drama Hum Dil De Chuke Sanam, and the family drama Hum Saath-Saath Hain. After another string of flops, he earned critical acclaim for playing a scorned lover in the romance Tere Naam and a brief role in the family drama Baghban (both 2003). He went on to star in the top-grossing comedies Mujhse Shaadi Karogi (2004), No Entry (2005) and Partner (2007). Khan made his television debut by hosting two seasons of the game show 10 Ka Dum (2008–09). Following a series of commercial failures from 2006 to 2008, his career saw a resurgence with the financially successful action films Wanted (2009) and Dabangg (2010). In 2010, Khan began hosting the television game show Bigg Boss, later hosting nine more seasons. He won the National Film Award for Best Children's Film for producing Chillar Party (2011) under Salman Khan Being Human Productions, and starred in the year's top grossers—the action comedies Ready and Bodyguard.

Khan's next releases Ek Tha Tiger (2012), Dabangg 2 (2012), Kick (2014), Bajrangi Bhaijaan (2015) and Prem Ratan Dhan Payo (2015) were among the most successful Indian films, making him the first actor with several consecutive films earning over 1 billion at the box-office. Among these, Bajrangi Bhaijaan earned over 900 crore worldwide and gained Khan a National Film Award for Best Popular Film Providing Wholesome Entertainment and a Filmfare Award nomination for Best Actor, making him the most nominated actor in the category without ever winning. He collaborated with director Ali Abbas Zafar to play titular lead in the top-grossing productions Sultan (2016), Tiger Zinda Hai (2017) and Bharat (2019). He has since received criticism for producing and starring in the panned action films Race 3 (2018), Dabangg 3 (2019) and Radhe (2021).

Film

Television

See also

 List of awards and nominations received by Salman Khan

Notes

Footnotes

References

External links
 Salman Khan filmography on IMDb
 Salman Khan filmography on Bollywood Hungama

Indian filmographies
Male actor filmographies
Filmography